is a railway station on the Ban'etsu West Line in the town of Nishiaizu, Yama District, Fukushima Prefecture,  Japan, operated by East Japan Railway Company (JR East).

Lines

Station layout
Tokusawa Station has a single unnumbered island platform, connected to the station building by a footbridge. The stations is staffed.

Platforms

History
Tokusawa Station opened on November 1, 1914. The station was absorbed into the JR East network upon the privatization of the Japanese National Railways (JNR) on April 1, 1987.

Surrounding area
Aga River

See also
 List of railway stations in Japan

External links

 JR East Station information 

Railway stations in Fukushima Prefecture
Ban'etsu West Line
Railway stations in Japan opened in 1914
Nishiaizu, Fukushima